Live Well, Change Often is the second album by Irish rock band The Minutes. It was released on 9 May 2014, through Model Citizen Records. The band claim that the album deals with "the reality of being in a rock 'n' roll band in the 21st Century, the hopes and the dreams, tempered with the shadows and illusions."

In its first week of release, the album peaked at number 12 in the official Irish Albums Chart.

Track listing
All songs written by The Minutes.

Singles

Personnel
 Mark Austin – Lead vocals, rhythm guitar
 Tom Cosgrave – Bass, backing vocals
 Shane Kinsella – Drums, backing vocals

References

2014 albums
The Minutes albums
Rubyworks Records albums